The Ming treasure voyages were the seven maritime expeditions undertaken by Ming China's treasure fleet between 1405 and 1433. The Yongle Emperor ordered the construction of the treasure fleet in 1403. The grand project resulted in far-reaching ocean voyages to the coastal territories and islands in and around the South China Sea, the Indian Ocean, and beyond. Admiral Zheng He was commissioned to command the treasure fleet for the expeditions. Six of the voyages occurred during the Yongle reign (r. 1402–24), while the seventh voyage occurred during the Xuande reign (r. 1425–1435). The first three voyages reached up to Calicut on India's Malabar Coast, while the fourth voyage went as far as Hormuz in the Persian Gulf. In the last three voyages, the fleet traveled up to the Arabian Peninsula and East Africa.

The Chinese expeditionary fleet was heavily militarized and carried great amounts of treasures, which served to project Chinese power and wealth to the known world. They brought back many foreign ambassadors whose kings and rulers were willing to declare themselves tributaries of China. During the course of the voyages, they destroyed Chen Zuyi's pirate fleet at Palembang, captured the Sinhalese Kotte kingdom of King Alekeshvara, and defeated the forces of the Semudera pretender Sekandar in northern Sumatra. The Chinese maritime exploits brought many foreign countries into the nation's tributary system and sphere of influence through both military and political supremacy, thus incorporating the states into the greater Chinese world order under Ming suzerainty. Moreover, the Chinese restructured and established control over an expansive maritime network in which the region became integrated and its countries became interconnected on an economic and political level.

The Ming treasure voyages were commanded and overseen by the eunuch establishment whose political influence was heavily dependent on imperial favor. Within Ming China's imperial state system, the civil officials were the primary political opponents of the eunuchs and the opposing faction against the expeditions. Around the end of the maritime voyages, the civil government gained the upper hand within the state bureaucracy, while the eunuchs gradually fell out of favor after the death of the Yongle Emperor and lost the authority to conduct these large-scale endeavors. The collapse of the expeditions was further brought about by the elite-driven economic interests against the central state control of commerce, as the maritime enterprise had been key to counterbalancing much of the localized private trade and thus drew the enmity of authorities that benefited from that trade.

Over the course of the maritime voyages in the early 15th century, Ming China became the pre-eminent naval power by projecting its sea power further to the south and west. There is still much debate regarding issues such as the actual purpose of the voyages, the size of the ships, the magnitude of the fleet, the routes taken, the nautical charts employed, the countries visited, and the cargo carried.

Background

Creation of the fleet

The Yongle Emperor of Ming China inherited a powerful navy from his predecessor, the Hongwu Emperor, and further developed it as an instrument for an expansive overseas policy. The  contains 24 short entries for the imperial orders for shipbuilding, with figures pointing to at least 2,868 ships, from 1403 to 1419. Over the course of 1403, the Fujian, Jiangxi, Zhejiang, and Huguang's provincial governments as well as Nanjing, Suzhou, and other cities' military garrisons were ordered to begin constructing ships.

Under the reign of the Yongle Emperor, Ming China underwent militaristic expansionism with ventures such as the treasure voyages. In 1403, he issued an imperial order to start the immense construction project of the treasure fleet. The treasure fleet was known by its original designation  in Chinese sources. It came to comprise many trading ships, warships, and support vessels. The Longjiang shipyard was the construction site for many of the fleet's ships, including all of the treasure ships. It was located on the Qinhuai River near Nanjing, where it flows into the Yangtze River. Many trees were cut along the Min River and upper reaches of the Yangtze to supply the necessary resources for the fleet's construction. Existing ships have also been converted to serve in the treasure fleet for the sea voyages, but this can only be said with certainty for 249 ships ordered in 1407.

The fleet's high-ranking officers, such as Zheng He and his associates, were from the eunuch establishment. For instance, Zheng served as the Grand Director in the Directorate of Palace Servants, a eunuch-dominated department, before his command of the expeditions. The emperor placed great trust in Zheng and appointed him to command the treasure fleet. He even gave him blank scrolls stamped with his seal to issue imperial orders at sea. All of the other principal officers, such as Wang Jinghong, Hou Xian, Li Xing, Zhu Liang, Zhou Man, Hong Bao, Yang Zhen, Zhang Da, and Wu Zhong, were court eunuchs employed in the civil service. The rest of the crew was predominantly from the Ming military and was mostly recruited from Fujian.

Regions
During the onset of their voyages, the Chinese treasure fleet embarked from the Longjiang shipyard and sailed down the Yangtze River to Liujiagang, where Zheng He organized his fleet and made sacrifices to the goddess Tianfei. Over the course of the following four to eight weeks, the fleet gradually proceeded to Taiping anchorage in Changle, where they waited for the favorable northeast winter monsoon before leaving the Fujian coast. The monsoon winds generally affected how the fleet sailed through the South China Sea and Indian Ocean. They reached the sea through the Wuhumen (lit. "five tiger passage") of the Min River in Fujian. The port of Qui Nhon in Champa was always the first foreign destination that the fleet visited.

The voyages sent the treasure fleet to the so-called Western Ocean (西洋), derived from an ancient Chinese geographical concept, which was used to refer to the maritime region encompassing today's South China Sea and Indian Ocean during the Ming dynasty. More specifically, contemporary sources including the Yingya Shenglan seem to indicate that the Eastern Ocean ended at Brunei and the Western Ocean was west of this place. 

During the first three voyages from 1405 to 1411, the fleet followed the same basic maritime route: from Fujian to the first call in Champa, across the South China Sea to Java and Sumatra, up the Strait of Malacca to northern Sumatra for assembly of the fleet, across the Indian Ocean to Ceylon, then along the Malabar Coast to Calicut. At the time, the fleet sailed no further than Calicut. During the fourth voyage, the route was extended to Hormuz. During the fifth, sixth, and seventh voyages, the fleet traveled further to destinations in the Arabian Peninsula and East Africa. For the sixth voyage, the fleet sailed up to Calicut, where several detached squadrons proceeded to further destinations at the Arabian Peninsula and East Africa. For the seventh voyage, the fleet followed the route up to Hormuz, while detached squadrons traveled to other places at the Arabian Peninsula and East Africa.

Course

First voyage

In the third lunar month (30 March to 28 April) of 1405, a preliminary order was issued to Admiral Zheng He and others to lead 27,000 troops to the Western Ocean. An imperial edict, dated 11 July 1405, was issued containing the order for the expedition. It was addressed to Zheng He, Wang Jinghong, and others.

The Yongle Emperor held a banquet for the crew on the evening before the fleet's maiden voyage. Gifts were presented to the officers and the common crew according to their rank. Sacrifices and prayers were offered to Tianfei, the patron goddess of sailors, in the hopes of ensuring a successful journey and safe passage during the voyage. In the autumn of 1405, the treasure fleet had assembled at Nanjing and was ready to depart from the city. According to the Taizong Shilu's 11 July 1405 entry about the dispatch of the fleet, Zheng and "others" departed for the first expedition "bearing imperial letters to the countries of the Western Ocean and with gifts to their kings of gold brocade, patterned silks, and colored silk gauze, according to their status". The treasure fleet made a stop at Liujiagang. There, the fleet was organized in squadrons while the fleet's crew honored Tianfei with prayers and sacrifices. Then, the fleet sailed down the coast to Taiping anchorage in Changle near the Min River where it awaited the northeast monsoon. More prayers and sacrifices were conducted for the goddess Tianfei by the crew during the wait. Afterwards, the fleet departed via the Wuhumen.

The treasure fleet sailed to Champa, Java, Malacca, Aru, Semudera, Lambri, Ceylon, Quilon, and Calicut. From Lambri, the treasure fleet sailed straight through the Indian Ocean instead of following the Bay of Bengal coastline to Ceylon. Three days after the departure from Lambri, a ship split off and went to the Andaman and Nicobar Islands. After six days from the separation, the treasure fleet saw the mountains of Ceylon and arrived at Ceylon's western coast two days later. They left this region as they were met with hostility from  the local ruler Alagakkonara. Dreyer (2007) states that it is possible that Zheng made port at Quilon—although there is no account confirming this—because the King of Quilon traveled with the fleet to China in 1407. Mills (1970) states that the fleet may have made a four-month stay at Calicut from December to April 1407. Around Cape Comorin at the southern tip of the Indian subcontinent, the treasure fleet changed direction and began its return journey to China. During the return, the fleet stopped at Malacca again.

During the return trip in 1407, Zheng and his associates engaged Chen Zuyi and his pirate fleet in battle at Palembang. Chen had seized Palembang and dominated the maritime route along the Malaccan Strait. The battle concluded with the defeat of Chen's pirate fleet by the Chinese fleet. He and his lieutenants were executed on 2 October 1407 when the fleet returned to Nanjing. The Ming court appointed Shi Jinqing as the Pacification Superintendent of Palembang, establishing an ally at Palembang and securing access to its port.

The fleet returned to Nanjing on 2 October 1407. After accompanying the treasure fleet during the return journey, the foreign envoys (from Calicut, Quilon, Semudera, Aru, Malacca, and other unspecified nations) visited the Ming court to pay homage and present tribute with their local products. The Yongle Emperor ordered the Ministry of Rites, whose duties included the protocol concerning foreign ambassadors, to prepare gifts for the foreign kings who had sent envoys to the court.

Second voyage

The imperial order for the second voyage was issued in October 1407. The edict was addressed to Zheng He, Wang Jinghong, and Hou Xian. Lang Ying's  records that Zheng, Wang, and Hou were dispatched in 1407.

On 30 October 1407, a grand director was dispatched with a squadron to Champa before Zheng followed with the main body of the fleet. The fleet departed in the fifth year of the Yongle reign (late 1407 or possibly early 1408). The fleet traveled from Nanjing to Liujiagang to Changle. Dreyer (2007) states that it is possible that Siam and Java were visited by the main fleet or by detached squadrons before regrouping at Malacca. During this voyage, Zheng and his fleet did not land on Ceylon. The fleet was tasked to carry out the formal investiture of Mana Vikraan as the King of Calicut. A tablet was placed in Calicut to commemorate the relationship between China and India.

In this voyage, the Chinese forcibly settled the enmity between Ming China and Java. In a civil war on Java between 1401 and 1406, the King of West Java killed 170 members of a Chinese embassy who had come ashore in his rival's territory at East Java. The entry dated to 23 October 1407 in the Ming Shilu states that the Western King of Java had sent an envoy to the Ming court to admit his guilt for mistakenly killing 170 Ming troops who had gone ashore to trade. It further states that the Ming court responded by demanding 60,000 liang of gold for compensation and atonement, warning that they would dispatch an army to punish the Javanese ruler for his crime if he failed to comply and stating that the situation in Annam (referring to Ming China's successful invasion of Vietnam) could serve as an example. The Chinese accepted the payment and apology, and restored diplomatic relations. Yan Congjian's  notes that the emperor later forgave 50,000  of gold that was still owed from this as long as the western ruler was remorseful for his crime. Tan (2005) remarks that Zheng had submitted the case of the killings to the emperor for a decision, rather than undertake a military invasion in revenge, as the killings were not willful. The Chinese would use further voyages to keep surveillance over Java.

During the journey, as recorded by Fei Xin, the fleet visited the Pulau Sembilan in the Strait of Malacca in the seventh year of the Yongle reign (1409). Dreyer (2007) concludes that the stop was made during the return journey of the second voyage as the treasure fleet did not leave the Chinese coast for the third voyage until early 1410. Fei wrote that "In the seventh year of Yongle, Zheng He and his associates sent government troops onto the island to cut incense. They obtained six logs, each eight or nine  in diameter and six or seven  in length, whose aroma was pure and far-ranging. The pattern [of the wood] was black, with fine lines. The people of the island opened their eyes wide and stuck out their tongues in astonishment, and were told that 'We are the soldiers of the Heavenly Court, and our awe-inspiring power is like that of the gods.'" The treasure fleet returned to Nanjing in the summer of 1409.

The confusion of whether Zheng undertook the second voyage stems from the fact that a Chinese envoy was dispatched before he had departed with the main body of the fleet. The imperial edict for the third voyage was issued during the second voyage while the treasure fleet was still in the Indian Ocean, so Zheng was either absent when the court issued the imperial order or he had not accompanied the fleet during the second voyage. On 21 January 1409, a grand ceremony was held in the honor of the goddess Tianfei, where she received a new title. Duyvendak (1938) thinks that Zheng could not have been on the second voyage, because the ceremony's importance required Zheng's attendance. Mills (1970), citing Duyvendak (1938), also states that he did not accompany the fleet for this voyage. However, Dreyer (2007) states that it is strongly suggested that Zheng had been on the second voyage, as Fei's account about the 1409 visit to Pulau Sembilan explicitly mentions him.

Third voyage

The imperial order for the third voyage was issued in the first month of the seventh year of the Yongle reign (16 January to 14 February 1409). It was addressed to Zheng He, Wang Jinghong, and Hou Xian.

Zheng embarked on the voyage in 1409. The fleet departed from Liujiagang in the ninth month (9 October to 6 November 1409) and arrived at Changle the following month (7 November to 6 December). They left Changle in the twelfth month (5 January to 3 February 1410). They proceeded via the Wuhumen. The fleet made stops at Champa, Java, Malacca, Semudera, Ceylon, Quilon, Cochin, and Calicut. They traveled to Champa within 10 days. Wang and Hou made short detours at Siam, Malacca, Semudera, and Ceylon. The treasure fleet landed at Galle, Ceylon, in 1410.

During the homeward journey in 1411, the treasure fleet confronted King Alakeshvara (Alagakkonara) of Ceylon. Alakeshvara posed a threat to the countries and local waters of Ceylon and southern India. When the Chinese arrived at Ceylon, they were overbearing and contemptuous of the Sinhalese, whom they considered rude, disrespectful, and hostile. They also resented the Sinhalese for attacking and committing piracy against neighboring countries that had diplomatic relations with Ming China. Zheng and 2,000 troops traveled overland into Kotte, because Alakeshvara had lured them into his territory. The king separated Zheng and his men from the treasure fleet anchored at Colombo, while he planned a surprise attack on the fleet. In response, Zheng and his troops invaded Kotte and captured its capital. The Sinhalese army, recorded to have over 50,000 troops, hastily returned and surrounded the capital, but were repeatedly defeated in battle by the invading Chinese troops. They took captive Alakeshvara, his family, and principal officials.

Zheng returned to Nanjing on 6 July 1411. He presented the Sinhalese captives to the Yongle Emperor, who decided to free and return them to their country. The Chinese dethroned Alakeshvara in favor of their ally Parakramabahu VI as the king with Zheng and his fleet supporting him. From then on, the treasure fleet did not experience hostilities during visits to Ceylon.

Fourth voyage

On 18 December 1412, the Yongle Emperor issued the order for the fourth voyage. Zheng He and others were commanded to lead it.

The emperor attended an archery contest for the Midsummer Festival of 1413 (5th day, 5th month, 11th year) that all the Chinese officials and foreign envoys were invited to. Duyvendak (1939) states that these envoys were so numerous that they most-likely comprised many of those whom Zheng escorted back to their countries during the fourth voyage rather than just close neighbors. This expedition led the treasure fleet into Muslim countries, so it must have been important for the Chinese to seek out reliable interpreters. The interpreter Ma Huan joined the voyages for the first time. A 1523 inscription at a Muslim mosque in Xi'an records that, on the 4th month of the 11th year, Zheng was there to seek reliable interpreters and found a man named Hasan.

Zheng's fleet left Nanjing in 1413, probably in the autumn. It set sail from Fujian in the 12th month of the 11th year in the Yongle reign (23 December 1413 to 21 January 1414). Calicut was the westernmost destination during the previous voyages, but the fleet sailed beyond it this time.

The fleet sailed to Champa, Kelatan, Pahang, Malacca, Palembang, Java, Lambri, Lide, Aru, Semudera, Ceylon,  (opposite Ceylon), Cochin; and Calicut. At Java, the fleet delivered gifts and favors from the Yongle Emperor. In return, a Javanese envoy arrived in China on 29 April 1415 and presented tribute in the form of "western horses" and local products while expressing gratitude.

In 1415, the fleet made a stop at northern Sumatra during the journey homeward. In this region, Sekandar had usurped the Semudera throne from Zain al-'Abidin, but the Chinese had formally recognized the latter as the King of Semudera. In contrast, Sekandar, an autonomous ruler, was not recognized by the Chinese. Zheng was ordered to launch a punitive attack against the usurper and restore Zain al-'Abidin as the rightful king. Sekandar led his forces, reportedly "tens of thousands" of soldiers, against the Ming forces, but was defeated. He reportedly attacked with "tens of thousands" of soldiers. The Ming forces pursued Sekandar's forces to Lambri where they captured Sekandar, his wife, and his child. King Zain al-'Abidin later dispatched a tribute mission to express his gratefulness. This conflict reaffirmed Chinese power over the foreign states and the maritime route by protecting the local political authority that sheltered the trade. Sekandar was presented to the Yongle Emperor at the palace gate and later executed. It is not known when this execution happened, but Ma states that Sekandar was publicly executed in the capital after the fleet returned. Fei Xin describes Sekandar as a false king who robbed, stole, and usurped the throne of Semudera, Ma Huan portrays him as someone who attempted to overthrow the ruler, and the Ming Shilu records that Sekandar was the younger brother of the former king and plotted to kill the ruler.

On 12 August 1415, Zheng's fleet returned to Nanjing from this voyage. The Yongle Emperor had been absent since 16 March 1413 for his second Mongol campaign and had not returned when the fleet arrived. After the fleet's return, envoys bearing tribute from 18 countries were sent to the Ming court.

Fifth voyage
On 14 November 1416, the Yongle Emperor returned to Nanjing. On 19 November, a grand ceremony was held where he bestowed gifts to princes, civil officials, military officers, and the ambassadors of 18 countries. On 19 December, the 18 ambassadors were received at the Ming court. On 28 December, they visited the Ming court to take their leave and were bestowed robes before departure. That day, the emperor ordered the undertaking of the fifth voyage, the aim of which was to return the 18 ambassadors and to reward their kings.

Zheng He and others received orders to escort the ambassadors back home. They carried imperial letters and gifts for several kings. The King of Cochin received special treatment because he had sent tribute since 1411 and later also sent ambassadors to request the patent of investiture and a seal. The Yongle Emperor granted him both requests, conferred to him a long inscription (allegedly composed by the emperor himself), and gave the title "State Protecting Mountain" to a hill in Cochin.

Zheng may have left the Chinese coast in the autumn of 1417. He first made port at Quanzhou to load up the fleet's cargo holds with porcelain and other goods. Archaeological finds of contemporary Chinese porcelain have been excavated at the East African places visited by Zheng's fleet. A Ming tablet at Quanzhou commemorates Zheng burning incense for divine protection for the voyage on 31 May 1417. The fleet visited Champa, Pahang, Java, Palembang, Malacca, Semudera, Lambri, Ceylon, Cochin, Calicut,  (possibly Cannanore),  (Maladive and Laccadive Islands), Hormuz, Aden, Mogadishu, Brava, and Malindi. For Arabia and East Africa, the most likely route was Hormuz, Aden, Mogadishu, Brava, and then Malindi. The  reports that Chinese ships reached the Aden coast in January 1419 and did not leave the Rasulid capital at Ta'izz before 19 March.

On 8 August 1419, the fleet had returned to China. The Yongle Emperor was in Beijing but ordered the Ministry of Rites to give monetary rewards to the fleet's personnel. The accompanying ambassadors were received at the Ming court in the eighth lunar month (21 August to 19 September) of 1419. Their tribute included lions, leopards, dromedary camels, ostriches, zebras, rhinoceroses, antelopes, giraffes, and other exotic animals. The arrival of the various animals brought by foreign ambassadors caused sensation at the Ming court.

Sixth voyage
The 's 3 March 1421 entry notes that the envoys of sixteen countries (Hormuz and other countries) were given gifts of paper money, coin money, ceremonial robes, and linings before the treasure fleet escorted them back to their countries. The imperial order for the sixth voyage was dated 3 March 1421. Zheng He was dispatched with imperial letters, silk brocade, silk floss, silk gauze, and other gifts for the rulers of these countries.

Gong Zhen's  records a 10 November 1421 imperial edict instructing Zheng He, Kong He, Zhu Buhua, and Tang Guanbao to arrange the provisions for Hong Bao and others' escort of foreign envoys to their countries. The envoys of the 16 different states were escorted to their homelands by the treasure fleet. It is likely that the first few destinations were Malacca and the three Sumatran states of Lambri, Aru, and Semudera. The fleet was divided into several detached squadrons at Semudera. The eunuch Zhou (probably Zhou Man) led a detached squadron to Aden. Ma Huan mentions Zhou Man and Li Xing in connection to the visit of Aden. Their squadron may have also visited  and Dhofar. Of the twelve visited nations west of Sumatra, this was the only one explicitly reported to have been visited by Zheng himself. Even though Quilon was not visited, the squadron for Mogadishu probably separated near Quilon as a navigation point while the main fleet continued to Calicut. A large squadron proceeded further from Calicut to Hormuz. They may have traveled via the Laccadives.

Upon return, several squadrons regrouped at Calicut and all the squadrons regrouped further at Semudera. Siam was likely visited during the return journey. The fleet returned on 3 September 1422. They brought with them envoys from Siam, Semudera, Aden, and other countries, who bore tribute in local products. The foreign envoys, who traveled to China with the fleet, proceeded overland or via the Grand Canal before reaching the imperial court at Beijing in 1423.

Nanjing garrison

On 14 May 1421, the Yongle Emperor ordered the temporary suspension of the voyages. At the expense of the treasure fleet's voyages, imperial attention and funding was diverted to the third, fourth, and fifth Mongol campaigns. Between 1422 and 1431, the treasure fleet remained in Nanjing to serve in the city's garrison.

In 1424, Zheng He departed on a diplomatic mission to Palembang. Meanwhile, Zhu Gaozhi ascended the throne as the Hongxi Emperor on 7 September 1424 following the death of his father, the Yongle Emperor, on 12 August 1424. Zheng returned from Palembang after this death.

The Hongxi Emperor was hostile to the undertaking of the treasure voyages. On 7 September 1424, he terminated further treasure voyages. He kept the treasure fleet, which retained its original designation , as a part of Nanjing's garrison. On 24 February 1425, he appointed Zheng as the defender of Nanjing and ordered him to continue his command over the treasure fleet for the city's defense. The Hongxi Emperor died on 29 May 1425 and was succeeded by his son as the Xuande Emperor.

On 25 March 1428, the Xuande Emperor ordered Zheng and others to supervise the rebuilding and repair of the Great Bao'en Temple at Nanjing. The temple was completed in 1431. It is possible that the funds to build it were diverted from the treasure voyages.

Seventh voyage

Gong Zhen records that an imperial order was issued on 25 May 1430 for the arrangement of necessary provisions for the dispatch of Zheng He, Wang Jinghong, Li Xing, Zhu Liang, Yang Zhen, Hong Bao, and others on official business to the countries of the Western Ocean. It was addressed to Yang Qing, Luo Zhi, Tang Guanbo, and Yuan Cheng. On 29 June 1430, the Xuande Emperor issued his orders for the seventh voyage. It was addressed to Zheng and others. The  reports that Zheng, Wang, and others were sent to distant foreign lands to bring them into deference and submission. The emperor wished to reinvigorate the tributary relations that were promoted during the Yongle reign. Before departing for the seventh voyage, Zheng and his associates had the Liujiagang and Changle inscriptions inscribed.

The  provides information about the dates and itinerary for this voyage. On 19 January 1431, the fleet embarked from Longwan (lit. "dragon bay") in Nanjing. On 2 February, they passed through the Fuzi Passage (present-day Baimaosha Channel). They arrived at Liujiagang on 3 February. They arrived at Changle on 8 April. They went to Fu Tou Shan (possibly near Fuzhou) on 16 December. On 12 January 1432, they passed through the Wuhumen (in the entrance to the Min River). They arrived at Vijaya (near present-day Qui Nhon) in Champa on 27 January and departed from there on 12 February. They arrived at Surabaya in Java on 7 March and departed from there on 13 July. The fleet arrived at Palembang on 24 July and departed from there on 27 July. They arrived at Malacca on 3 August and departed from there on 2 September. They arrived at Semudera on 12 September and departed from there on 2 November. They arrived at Beruwala in Ceylon on 28 November and departed from there on 2 December. They arrived at Calicut on 10 December and departed from there on 14 December. They arrived at Hormuz on 17 January 1433 and departed from there on 9 March.

The  and other sources describe the voyage with the fleet visiting at least seventeen countries (including those already mentioned in the ). Gong recorded a total of 20 visited countries. Fei Xin mentions that the fleet stopped at the Andaman and Nicobar island chains during the voyage. He further writes that the native men and women came in log boats to trade coconuts. The neighboring Aru, Nagur, Lide, and Lambri were certainly visited by a few ships, according to Dreyer (2007), on the way to Semudera in northern Sumatra.

Dreyer (2007) states that the account is unclear on whether he went to those places in person, but the wording could indicate that he did as it states that he proclaimed imperial instructions to the kings of these countries. The overland journey may have been undertaken by someone other than Zheng.

Hong commanded a squadron for the journey to Bengal. Ma Huan was among the personnel in this squadron. It is not known when they exactly detached from the treasure fleet for Bengal. They sailed directly from Semudera to Bengal. In Bengal, they traveled in order to Chittagong, Sonargaon, and the capital Gaur. Afterwards, they sailed directly from Bengal to Calicut. Zheng's fleet had departed from Calicut for Hormuz by the time Hong's squadron arrived in Calicut. In Calicut, Hong noticed that local ships were being prepared for Mecca and sent seven Chinese men to accompany a ship bound for Mecca. It is likely that Ma was one of the people who visited Mecca. After a year, the seven men returned with commodities and valuables, including giraffes, lions, and ostriches, that they had purchased. Dreyer (2007) suggests that Hong may also have been involved with other destinations such as Dhofar, Aden, Mogadishu, and Brava.

Dreyer (2007) states that the following countries may also have been visited by a few of the ships when the fleet passed by them: Siam; the northern Sumatran states of Aru, Nagur, Lide, and Lambri (when sailing to Semudera); and Quilon and Cochin (when sailing to Calicut). Mills (1970) concludes that Zheng's associates—not Zheng himself—had visited Siam, Aru, Nagur, Lide, Lambri, Nicobar Islands, Bengal, Quilon, Cochi, Coimbatore, Maldive Islands, Dhufar, Aden, Mecca, Mogadishu, and Brava. Pelliot (1933) suggests that the squadrons detached from the fleet at Hormuz to travel to Aden, the East African ports and perhaps .

The  also provided the dates and itinerary, as described hereafter, for the return route of the seventh voyage. The fleet departed from Hormuz on 9 March 1433, arrived at Calicut on 31 March, and departed from Calicut on 9 April to sail across the ocean. They arrived at Semudera on 25 April and left there on 1 May. On 9 May, they arrived at Malacca. They arrived at the Kunlun Ocean on 28 May. They arrived at Vijaya (present-day Qiu Nhon) on 13 June and left there on 17 June. The  records several geographical sightings at this point. The fleet arrived at Taicang on 7 July. The  notes that it did not record the later stages, that is, the journey between Taicang and the capital. On 22 July 1433, they arrived in the capital Beijing. On 27 July, the Xuande Emperor bestowed ceremonial robes and paper money to the fleet's personnel.

According to Dreyer (2007), the fleet's detached squadrons were probably already assembled at Calicut for the homeward journey, as the main fleet did not remain long there. He states that they did not stop at Ceylon or southern India, because they were sailing under favorable conditions and were running before the southwest monsoon. Ma records that the various detached ships reassembled in Malacca to wait for favorable winds before continuing their return.

Zheng returned with envoys from 11 countries, including one from Mecca. On 14 September 1433, as recorded in the Xuanzong Shilu, the following envoys came to court to present tribute: King Zain al-Abidin of Semudera sent his younger brother Halizhi Han and others, King Bilima of Calicut sent his ambassador Gebumanduluya and others, King Keyili of Cochin sent his ambassador Jiabubilima and others, King Parakramabahu VI of Ceylon sent his ambassador Mennidenai and others, King Ali of Dhofar sent his ambassador Hajji Hussein and others, King Al-Malik az-Zahir Yahya b. Isma'il of Aden sent his ambassador Puba and others, King Devaraja of Coimbatore sent his ambassador Duansilijian and others, King Sa'if-ud-Din of Hormuz sent the foreigner Malazu, the King of "Old Kayal" (Jiayile) sent his ambassador Abd-ur-Rahman and others, and the King of Mecca sent the headman (toumu) Shaxian and others.

Aftermath

Situation near the end

During the course of the voyages, Ming China had become the pre-eminent naval power of the early 15th century. The Yongle Emperor had extended imperial control over foreign lands during the span of the voyages. However, in 1433, the voyages ceased and Ming China turned away from the seas.

The trade still flourished long after the voyages had ceased. Chinese ships continued to control the Eastern Asian maritime trade, and also kept on trading with India and East Africa. However, the imperial tributary system over the foreign regions and state monopoly over the foreign trade gradually broke down as time progressed, while private trade supplanted the centralized tributary trade. The Ming treasure voyages had been a means to establish direct links between the Ming court and foreign tribute states, which had effectively outflanked both private channels of trade and local civil officials who were sabotaging the prohibitions against overseas exchange. The end of the voyages led to the shift of foreign commerce to the domain of local authorities, which further undermined the authority of the central government.

The nobility and military were an important part of the ruling elite during the Hongwu and Yongle reigns, but the political power gradually shifted to the civil government. As a consequence, the eunuch faction was unable to gather enough support to initiate projects opposed by civil officials. These bureaucrats remained wary of any attempt by the eunuchs to restart the treasure voyages. However, no later emperor would seriously consider undertaking new expeditions. The withdrawal of Ming China's treasure fleet resulted in a power vacuum across the Indian Ocean.

Causes of cessation
It is not exactly known why the voyages completely ended in 1433. Duyvendak (1939) suggests that the heavy costs partly contributed to the ending of the expeditions, but Ray (1987), Finlay (1992), and Dreyer (2007) note that the costs for undertaking the voyages had not overburdened the Ming treasury. Ray (1987) adds that the Ming treasure voyages were a profitable enterprise and rejects the notion that the voyages were terminated because they were wasteful, costly, or uneconomic.

Even though civil officials had ill feelings towards eunuchs for their overbearing nature and interference in state affairs, much of the hostility that came to characterize the relationship between the officials and eunuchs manifested long after the voyages ended, when eunuchs wielded their power to enrich themselves through extortion and to persecute their critics. According to Lo (1958) and Ray (1987), the hostility between these factions cannot explain the cessation of the voyages. Lo (1958) also notes that Zheng He was on friendly terms with many high officials and was respected by them, while Ray (1987) mentions that eunuchs such as Zheng He and Hou Xian were held in high esteem by the court. The voyages were also favorably depicted in contemporary records.

Ray (1987) states that the cessation of the Ming treasure voyages primarily happened as traders and bureaucrats, for reasons of economic self-interest and through their connections in Beijing, gradually collapsed the framework supporting both the state-controlled maritime enterprise and the strict regulation of the private commerce with prohibitive policies. Similarly, Lo (1958) states that rich and influential individuals used their connections in Beijing to undermine efforts to restore the trade to official channels and possibly revive the voyages, because they wanted to safeguard their interests and were antagonistic to the government's monopoly of foreign trade.

Impact

Goals and consequences
  
The voyages were diplomatic, militaristic, and commercial in nature. They were conducted to establish imperial control over the maritime trade, to bring the maritime trade into the tributary system, and to force foreign countries to comply with the tributary system. The diplomatic aspect comprised the announcement of the Yongle Emperor's accession to the throne, the establishment of hegemony over the foreign countries, and safe passage to foreign envoys who came bearing tribute. The emperor may have sought to legitimize his reign by compelling foreign countries to recognize their tributary status, as he came to rule the Chinese empire by usurping the Ming throne.

The Chinese did not seek territorial control, as they were primarily motivated by the political and economic control across space entailing domination over a vast network with its ports and shipping lanes. Finlay (2008) underscores the goal of controlling maritime commerce in which the Ming treasure voyages are regarded as an attempt to reconcile China's need for maritime commerce with the government's suppression of the private aspects of maritime commerce, representing "a deployment of state power to bring into line the reality of seaborne commerce with an expansive conception of Chinese hegemony." The trading centers along the maritime routes were kept open to other foreign people and remained unoccupied in a joint effort to further promote international trade. Neither the pursuit for exclusive access nor the forceful integration of foreign countries' wealth (through exclusive exploitation by removal of natural or human resources) was a feature of the expeditions.

The voyages changed the organization of the maritime network, utilizing and creating nodes and conduits in its wake, which restructured international and cross-cultural relationships and exchanges. It was especially impactful as no other polity had exerted naval dominance over all sectors of the Indian Ocean prior to these voyages. The Ming promoted alternative nodes as a strategy to establish control over the network. For instance, Chinese involvement was a crucial factor for ports such as Malacca (in Southeast Asia), Cochin (on the Malabar Coast), and Malindi (on the Swahili Coast) to grow as key contenders to other important and established ports. Through the voyages, Ming China intervened with the local affairs of foreign states and asserted itself in foreign lands. The Chinese installed or supported friendly local regimes, captured or executed rivals of local authorities, and threatened hostile local rulers into compliance. The appearance of the Ming treasure fleet generated and intensified competition among contending polities and rivals, each seeking an alliance with the Ming.

The voyages brought about the Western Ocean's regional integration and the increase in international circulation of people, ideas, and goods. It provided a platform for cosmopolitan discourses, which took place in locations such as the ships of the Ming treasure fleet, the Ming capitals of Nanjing as well as Beijing, and the banquet receptions organized by the Ming court for foreign representatives. People from different countries congregated, interacted, and traveled together as the Ming treasure fleet sailed from and to Ming China. For the first time in its history, as Sen (2016) emphasizes, the maritime region from China to Africa was under the dominance of a single imperial power, which allowed for the creation of a cosmopolitan space.

Another purpose of the Chinese expeditions was the maintenance of political-ideological control across the region. In this regard, the various countries needed to acknowledge that China was the hegemonic power in the region, not cause trouble with neighboring people, and accept the tributary system out of their own self-interest. Foreign rulers were compelled to acknowledge the inherent moral and cultural superiority of China, an obligation expressed by paying homage and presenting tribute before the Ming court. The Chinese intended to civilize the many foreign peoples by bringing them into formal submission within Ming China's greater world order. During the course of the voyages, the Yongle Emperor reasserted the political and cultural hegemony of Ming China over all others. The cultural aspect of the voyages appears in the Liujiagang inscription, stating that "those among the foreigners who were resisting the transforming influence (genghua) of Chinese culture and were disrespectful, we captured alive, and brigands who indulged in violence and plunder, we ex-terminated. Consequently the sea-route was purified and tranquillised and the natives were enabled quietly to pursue their avocations."

The treasure fleet was, as Mills (1970) characterizes, "an instrument of aggression and political dominance." It brought forth the manifestation of China's power and wealth to awe foreign lands under Chinese hegemony. This was actualized by showing the Ming flag and establishing a military presence along the maritime trade routes. Diplomatic relationships were based on mutually beneficial maritime commerce and a visible presence of a Chinese militaristic naval force in foreign waters. The Ming Chinese naval superiority was a crucial factor in this interaction, namely because it was inadvisable to risk punitive action from the Chinese fleet. In addition, the worthwhile and profitable nature of the Ming treasure voyages for foreign countries was a persuading factor to comply.

A theory, considered very unlikely, suggests the voyages were initiated to search for the dethroned Jianwen Emperor. This search is mentioned as a reason for the voyages in the later . According to Wang (1998), the announced intent of the Yongle Emperor to find the deposed Jianwen Emperor may have served no more than a public justification for the voyages in the face of prohibitive policies for military actions overseas from the Hongwu reign. Also considered very unlikely is the theory that the voyages were a response to the Timurid state of Tamerlane, another power across Asia and an enemy of Ming China. Ming China was left unchallenged by the Timurid after Tamerlane's death in 1405, because the new Timurid ruler Shahrukh (r. 1405–1447) normalized diplomatic relations with China and was preoccupied with holding his state together. Both theories lack evidential support in contemporary historical sources.

Policy and administration

In the Ming court, the civil officials were the faction who opposed the voyages. They condemned the expeditions as extravagant and wasteful, but the Yongle Emperor was unconcerned about the costs of the voyages and was determined to undertake them. In contrast, the eunuch establishment stood at the head of the treasure fleet and the expeditions. Traditionally, civil officials were the political opponents to the eunuch faction and to the military who crewed the fleet. This political and institutional disadvantage within the state system contributed to the inherent opposition of these bureaucrats against the voyages. Moreover, civil officials criticized the state expenses brought by the fleet's construction, but the emperor was set on realizing its formation. Construction projects were in fact usually the domain of eunuchs. Eunuchs were assigned to supervise the fleet's construction, while the military was assigned to carry it out. On cultural grounds, the civil officials were hostile to the voyages, because the trade and acquisition of strange foreign goods conflicted with their Confucian ideologies. The undertaking of these expeditions only remained possible as long as the eunuchs maintained imperial favor.

The Hongwu Emperor was wary of the political and social consequences that maritime commerce could bring, so he sought to restrain it by outlawing private maritime trade. This policy continued well into the Yongle reign. In addition, the Yongle Emperor aimed at consolidating imperial control over maritime commerce, stopping the coastal criminality and disorder, providing employment for mariners and entrepreneurs, exporting Chinese products to foreign markets, importing desired goods for Chinese consumers, extending the tributary system, and displaying imperial majesty to the seas. The voyages functioned as trade commissions in the government's attempts to regulate maritime commerce by establishing an imperial monopoly over it and incorporating it into the tributary system. Dreyer (2007) states that there seems to have been an idea about a foreign policy comprising an extended foreign trade supported by a heavy military naval presence and a cultivation of shared interests with local allies.

The emperor's interest in the voyages was the highest during the period spanning the first three voyages, but he became more occupied with his offensive military campaigns against the Mongols after establishing the capital at Beijing. By the fourth voyage, he showed interest in the expansion of trade and diplomatic activity to West Asia. Therefore, the Chinese sought and employed Persian and Arabic language interpreters, such as Ma Huan and Guo Chongli, to accompany the fleet. After the capital was transferred from Nanjing to Beijing, the south and the seas were given less and less attention from emperors and officials alike. The Hongxi Emperor wished to revert his predecessor's relocation of the capital, but he died on 29 May 1425 before he could do so. He was succeeded by the Xuande Emperor who remained in Beijing. Dreyer (2007) states that the prospects for the voyages would have been better if the capital was relocated back to Nanjing, because the court would have been near the locations where the voyages started and the Longjiang shipyards where most of the ships were built.

Minister of Finance Xia Yuanji was a vocal opponent to the treasure voyages. The Hongxi Emperor was also fiercely against the treasure voyages throughout his reign. After taking Xia's advice, the emperor ordered the cessation of the treasure voyages on 7 September 1424, the day of his accession to the throne. In contrast, the Xuande Emperor went against the general court opinion when he ordered the seventh voyage. This emperor relied on eunuchs during his reign, whereas the Hongxi Emperor had relied on civil officials.

After 1433, the civil officials succeeded in halting subsequent maritime expeditions. The ships were left to rot and their lumber was sold for fuel in Nanjing. The mariners were reassigned to load grain on barges of the Grand Canal and to build the emperor's mausoleum. After the voyages, subsequent Ming emperors would reject the Yongle Emperor's policy of bringing the maritime trade into the structure of the tributary system. The Chinese government's conservative anti-trade policies would contribute to the rise of private trade, which led to the emergence and growth of family-led multinational networks.

Personnel and organization

The Chinese treasure fleet comprised an array of ships, each of which fulfilled specialized functions. The treasure ships were the largest vessels in the fleet and functioned, in the words of Finlay (2008), as "an emporium offering a wealth of products". They were each crewed by about 500 men according to Mills (1970) or at least 600 men according to Finlay (1992). Ma Huan mentions that their traders used small ships (小船 xiaochuan) to go ashore, presumably while the larger ships remained anchored in the harbor according to Church (2005). Gong Zhen mentions ships specifically designated to carry water.

The Liujiagang inscription records Zheng He and Wang Jinghong as the principal envoys. It also records Zhu Liang, Zhou Man, Hong Bao, Yang Zhen, and Zhang Da as deputy envoys. The Changle inscription repeats this, but adds Li Xing and Wu Zhong as deputy envoys. All envoys are recorded to have carried the rank of Grand Director in both inscriptions, except Zhang Da who was reported with the rank of Senior Assistant Director in the Liujiagang inscription and the rank of Grand Director in the Changle inscription. Additionally, the Changle inscription mentions Zhu Zhen and Wang Heng as the brigadiers. These people and unnamed "others" are mentioned on the respective inscriptions as those who have composed it. The Changle inscription also mentions that the Daoist priest Yang Yichu begged to erect the respective stele.

There were seven Grand Directors—who served as the ambassadors and commanders of the fleet—and ten Junior Directors. They were all eunuchs. Zheng was one of the Grand Directors. In total, there were 70 eunuchs in command of the treasure fleet. This was followed by two brigadiers, 93 captains, 104 lieutenants, and 103 sub-lieutenants. There were also 180 medical personnel, a Ministry of Finance bureau director, two secretaries, two Court of State Ceremonial protocol officers, an astrological officer, and four astrologers. The personnel also had guard judges and battalion judges. Religious leaders from different faiths such as Buddhism, Hinduism, and Islam also served in the fleet.

Zhu Yunming's  records the following personnel: officers and petty officers, soldiers, mess leaders, helmsman, anchormen, interpreters, business managers, accountants, doctors, anchor mechanics, caulkers, sailmakers, sailors, and boatmen.

For the first voyage, the fleet had a personnel of 27,800 or 27,870 men. The fleet comprised 317 ships, which included 62 treasure ships. It is possible that the fleet had 63 treasure ships. The Mingshi states that the fleet had 62 treasure ships and a crew of 27,800 for the first voyage. Tan Qian's Guoque records 63 treasure ships and a crew of 27,870 for the first voyage. The Zuiweilu records a personnel of 37,000, but this is probably an error. The Taizong Shilu records two imperial orders for ship construction to the Nanjing's capital guards: one for 200 ships (海運船 haiyunchuan) on 4 September 1403 and one for 50 ships (海船 haichuan) on 1 March 1404. The text did not record the purpose for which these 250 ships were constructed. Yan Congjian's Shuyu Zhouzilu conflated this to one imperial order for the construction of 250 ships specifically for the voyages to the Western Ocean. The Taizong Shilu also records a 2 March 1404 imperial order for Fujian to construct five ships (haichuan) to be used in the voyages to the Western Ocean. These 255 ships plus the 62 treasure ships add up to 317 ships for the first voyage.

For the second voyage, it is thought that the treasure fleet comprised 249 ships. On 5 October 1407, as the  records, Wang Hao was ordered to supervise the conversion of 249 ships in preparation for embassies to the countries at the Western Ocean. This was close to the date when the second voyage was ordered, thus the fleet likely comprised these 249 ships for the second voyage. The number of treasure ships or personnel is not known.

For the third voyage, Fei Xin's  records that the fleet had 48  and a crew of over 27,000. Yan's  and Lu Rong's  use the term "treasure ship" instead when they mention the 48 ships for this voyage. Coincidentally, the  records the imperial order issued on 14 February 1408 for the construction of 48 treasure ships to the Ministry of Works at Nanjing; these were possibly the 48 treasure ships for the third voyage. Dreyer (2007) states that the treasure fleet likely had an undisclosed array of support ships in addition to the 48 treasure ships.

Ma's  records 63 treasure ships for the fourth voyage. Dreyer (2007) says that these were probably accompanied by support ships. The fleet was crewed by 28,560 or 27,670 men. Fei records a personnel of 27,670 for this voyage, but another source records 28,560.

There is no record for the number of ships or personnel for the fifth voyage.

On 2 October 1419, an order was issued for the construction of 41 treasure ships from an undisclosed shipbuilder. Most scholars conclude that these were likely used for the sixth voyage, but many other treasure ships had already been constructed or were in construction by that time. There is no specific figure for the ships or personnel of the sixth voyage. The treasure fleet probably made use of several dozen of the treasure ships each accompanied by half a dozen support vessels.

For the seventh voyage, the Liujiagang and Changle inscriptions speak of over a hundred large ships (巨舶 jubo). Dreyer (2007) suggests that these ships probably included most of the remaining treasure ships, which were likely accompanied by support ships. The fleet had 27,550 men as personnel for the voyage.

Military affairs
Before the voyages, there was turmoil around the seas near the Chinese coast and distant Southeast Asian maritime regions, characterized by piracy, banditry, slave trade, and other illicit activities. The treasure fleet had a large number of warships to protect their precious cargo and to secure the maritime routes. They established a substantial Chinese military presence around the South China Sea and trading cities in southern India. The early stages of the voyages were especially characterized by highly militaristic objectives, as the Chinese stabilized the sea passages from hostile entities as well as strengthened their own position and maintained their status in the region. Even though Zheng He sailed through the oceans with a military force larger and stronger than any local power, there is no written evidence in historical sources that there was any attempt that they forcibly tried to control the maritime trade in the regions of the South China Sea and Indian Ocean. Dreyer (2007) adds that the large Chinese fleet would still have been a "terrifying apparition" when it came within visible reach along the coastlines of foreign nations, bringing any state into submission by the sole sight of it alone. From the fourth voyage onwards, the treasure fleet ventured further than their usual end-destination of Calicut to lands beyond where there would be less direct hostilities.

The fleet engaged and defeated Chen Zuyi's pirate fleet in Palembang, Alakeshvara's forces in Ceylon, and Sekandar's forces in Semudera, bringing security and stability of the maritime routes via Chinese control. These actors were viewed as hostile threats in their regions and the battles served as a reminder of the tremendous power of Ming China to the countries along the maritime routes.

On the Malabar coast, Calicut and Cochin were in an intense rivalry, so the Ming decided to intervene by granting special status to Cochin and its ruler . He delivered a stone tablet, inscribed with a proclamation composed by the Yongle Emperor, to Cochin. As long as Cochin remained under the protection of Ming China, the Zamorin of Calicut could not invade Cochin and a military conflict was averted. Consequently, the cessation of the Ming treasure voyages was followed by the invasion of Cochin by the Zamorin of Calicut.

In Malacca, the Chinese actively sought to develop a commercial hub and a base of operation for the voyages into the Indian Ocean. Malacca had been a relatively insignificant region, not even qualifying as a polity prior to the voyages according to both Ma Huan and Fei Xin, and was a vassal region of Siam. In 1405, the Ming court dispatched Zheng with a stone tablet enfeoffing the Western Mountain of Malacca as well as an imperial order elevating the status of the port to a country. The Chinese also established a government depot as a fortified cantonment for their soldiers. It served as a storage facility as the fleet traveled and assembled from other destinations within the maritime region. Ma reports that Siam did not dare to invade Malacca thereafter. The rulers of Malacca, such as King Paramesvara in 1411, would pay tribute to the Chinese emperor in person. In 1431, when a Malaccan representative complained that Siam was obstructing tribute missions to the Ming court, the Xuande Emperor dispatched Zheng carrying a threatening message for the Siamese king saying "You, king should respect my orders, develop good relations with your neighbours, examine and instruct your subordinates and not act recklessly or aggressively."

Diplomacy and commerce

The commodities that the fleet's ships carried included three major categories: gifts to be bestowed on rulers, items for exchange of goods or payment of goods with fixed prices at low rates (e.g. gold, silver, copper coins, and paper money), and items which China held a monopoly over (e.g. musks, ceramics, and silks). It was said that there were sometimes so many Chinese goods unloaded into an Indian port that it could take months to price everything. In turn, Zheng He returned to China with many kinds of tribute goods, such as silver, spices, sandalwood, precious stones, ivory, ebony, camphor, tin, deer hides, coral, kingfisher feathers, tortoise shells, gums and resin, rhinoceros horn, sapanwood and safflower (for dyes and drugs), Indian cotton cloth, and ambergris (for perfume). The ships even brought back exotic animals, such as ostriches, elephants, and giraffes. The imports from the voyages provided large quantities of economic goods that fueled China's own industries. For example, there was so much cobalt oxide from Persia that the porcelain industry at Jingdezhen had a plentiful supply for decades after the voyages. The fleet also returned with such a large amount of black pepper that the once-costly luxury became a common commodity in Chinese society.

The treasure voyages resulted in a flourishing Ming economy and stimulated the lucrative maritime commerce. The expeditions developed into a maritime trade enterprise where the Chinese began trading and supplying the commodities that were non-Chinese in origin. This highlighted the commercial character of the voyages in which the Chinese expanded upon the already large profits from their trade. The impact of the expeditions on commerce was on multiple levels: it established imperial control over local private commercial networks, expanded tributary relations and thereby brought commerce under state supervision, established court-supervised transactions at foreign ports and thereby generate substantial revenue for both parties, and increased production and circulation of commodities across the region. The voyages induced a sudden supply shock in the Eurasian market, where the Chinese maritime exploits in Asia led to disruptions of imports to Europe with sudden price spikes in the early 15th century.

Imperial proclamations were issued to foreign kings, meaning that they could either submit and be bestowed with rewards or refuse and be pacified under the threat of an overwhelming military force. Foreign kings had to reaffirm their recognition of the Chinese emperor's superior status by presenting tribute. Those rulers who submitted received political protection and material rewards. Many countries were enrolled as tributaries. The treasure fleet conducted the transport of the many foreign envoys to China and back, but some envoys traveled independently.

Geography and society

The treasure fleet sailed the equatorial and subtropical waters of the South China Sea and Indian Ocean, where they were dependent on the circumstances of the annual cycle of monsoon winds. Therefore, the fleet's navigators precisely organized the voyages under careful considerations of the periodical patterns of the tropical and subtropical monsoon. For the southward route from Changle in China to Surabaya in Java, the fleet followed the northeast wind, crossed the Equator (where the northeast wind changes into the northwest wind due to the Coriolis force), and then followed the northwest wind. At Java, the fleet waited for the arrival of the tropical southeast wind in the Southern Hemisphere and used it to sail towards Sumatra. At Sumatra, the fleet was halted due to the change of the southeast wind into a strong southwest wind at a northern latitude close to the equator and waited until next winter for the northeast wind. For the northwestward route towards Calicut and Hormuz, the Chinese took advantage of the northeastern wind. The return journey was set during the late summer and early autumn because favorable monsoon winds were present at that time. The fleet left Hormuz before the southwestern monsoon arrived over the Indian Ocean. They made use of the northern wind for the southward journey from Hormuz to Calicut. For the eastward journey from Sumatra, the fleet used the newly arrived southwestern monsoon over the eastern parts of the Indian Ocean. After the fleet passed through the Strait of Malacca, the fleet caught up with the southwest wind over the South China Sea to sail back to China. As maritime conditions were limited by the monsoon winds, squadrons were detached from the main fleet to diverge to specific destinations. The first point of divergence was Sumatra from where a squadron would travel to Bengal. The second point of divergence was Calicut, from where ships sailed to Hormuz as well as other destinations at the Arabian Peninsula and East Africa. Malacca was the rendezvous point where the squadrons would reassemble for the final leg of the return journey.

During all the voyages, the fleet departed from Sumatra to sail westward across the Indian Ocean. Northern Sumatra was an important region for the fleet's anchorage and assembly before they proceeded through the Indian Ocean to Ceylon and southern India. Its location was more important to the fleet than its wealth or products. Ma Huan wrote that Semudera was the main route to the Western Ocean and characterized it as the most important port of assembly for the Western Ocean. The journey from Sumatra to Ceylon took about two to four weeks without seeing land. The first part of Ceylon that became visible after departure from Sumatra was Namanakuli (or Parrot's Beak Mountain), the easternmost mountain (6680 ft in elevation and 45 miles away from the coast). Two or three days after its sighting, the treasure fleet adjusted their course to sail south of Dondra Head at Ceylon. After a considerable long time at sea since leaving Sumatra, the fleet arrived at a port in Ceylon, usually at Beruwala and sometimes at Galle. The Chinese preferred Beruwala over Galle, even though they have made port at both locations. Ma characterized Beruwala as "the wharf of the country of Ceylon."

Ming China had cordial relations with Calicut, which was valuable as they tried to extend the tributary system to the states around the Indian Ocean. Ma described Calicut as the "great country of the Western Ocean" and had a positive response to the Calicut authorities' regulation of trade and attention to weights and measurements. Fei Xin described Calicut as the "great harbor" of the Western Ocean countries.

Navigation

During the voyages, the fleet acquired and collected a large amount of navigational data. These were specifically recorded by the astrological officer and his four astrologers. The navigational data were processed into different types of charts by a cartographic office, comprising an astrological officer, four astrologers, and their clerks. It provided the expeditionary commanders with the necessary navigational charts for their voyages. Many copies of the expeditionary charts were housed in the Ministry of War. Additional navigational data were probably also supplied by local maritime pilots, Arab records, Indian records, and other Chinese records.

The Mao Kun map depicts the routes taken by the Chinese treasure fleet during the voyages. It is collected in the Wubei Zhi, compiled by Mao Yuanyi. It portrays various geographic locations from Nanjing to Hormuz as well as the East African coast, with routes illustrated by dotted lines. Mills (1954) dates the map's directions to about 1422, as he believes that the navigational data was compiled during the expedition between 1421 and 1422. The directions are expressed by compass points and distances in watches, with references to navigational techniques (such as depth sounding to avoid shallow waters) and astronomy (particularly along the north–south route of Africa where the latitude is determined by the height of constellations relative to the horizon). The Mao Kun map is appended by four stellar diagrams that were used to determine the position of the ship in relation to the stars and constellations on specific sections of the maritime route.

Faith and ceremony

The faith of the Chinese fleet's crew was centered around Tianfei, the "Heavenly Princess" who was the goddess of sailors and seafarers. The Liujiagang and Changle inscriptions suggest that Zheng He's life was mostly defined by the treasure voyages and that his devotion to Tianfei was the dominant faith that he adhered to. The two inscriptions honored and commemorated the goddess Tianfei. Zheng and his associates established these inscriptions at the temples of Tianfei at Liujiagang on 14 March 1431 and Changle between 5 December 1431 and 3 January 1432. These inscriptions make reference to the crew witnessing St. Elmo's fire during dangerous storms and interpreting it as a sign of divine protection by Tianfei. The Liujiagang and Changle inscriptions are considered the epitaphs of the Ming treasure voyages.

In Galle, Ceylon, Zheng set up a trilingual inscription dated 15 February 1409. The inscription is in three languages, in which the Chinese section praised the Buddha, the Tamil section praised the local god Tenavarai Nayanar (an incarnation of Vishnu), and the Persian section praised Allah. Each section contains a similar list of offerings, such as 1,000 pieces of gold, 5,000 pieces of silver, 100 rolls of silk, 2,500 catties of perfumed oil, and a variety of bronze ornaments. As shown by this inscription, the Chinese paid their respect to the three dominant religions in Ceylon.

On 20 September 1414, Bengali envoys presented a giraffe as tribute in the name of King Saif Al-Din Hamzah Shah of Bengal (r. 1410–1412) to the Yongle Emperor of Ming China. The giraffe was identified as the qilin, but the emperor did not want his officials to send laudatory memorials on behalf of its auspicious appearance during his reign and, as suggested by Church (2004), probably did not think it was a qilin.

Historiography

There are several extant contemporary accounts, including Ma Huan's Yingya Shenglan [], Fei Xin's Xingcha Shenglan [], and Gong Zhen's Xiyang Fanguo Zhi []. Ma served as an interpreter on the fourth, sixth, and seventh voyage. He collaborated with Guo Chongli, who participated in three of the expeditions, on his work. Fei served as a soldier on the third, fifth, and seventh expedition. Gong served as Zheng's private secretary on the seventh voyage. These three sources provide observations to the political, economic, social, cultural, and religious conditions of the lands visited throughout the voyages. In addition, the Liujiagang and Changle inscriptions by Zheng He and his associates are considered to be valuable records.

The Ming Shilu [明實錄] provides a lot of the information relating to the treasure voyages, particularly the exchange of ambassadors. The work is divided into individual sections about the reigns of Ming emperors. Zheng lived through the reigns of five Ming emperors, but he directly served three emperors. The  combined the second and third voyages into one expedition. The conflation of these two voyages into one voyage caused Zheng's Palembang journey from 1424 to 1425 to be wrongly construed as the sixth voyage to fulfill the count of seven voyages. However, the Liujiagang and Changle inscriptions make a clear distinction between the second and third voyage as they correctly date the second voyage from 1407 to 1409 and the third voyage from 1409 to 1411.

A number of later works have been preserved. The accounts in the Mingshi [明史] (1739) and Huang Xingzeng's  [] (1520) rely on Ma's original . Zhu Yunming's  ['A Record of Things Once Heard'] (ca. 1526) contains his  [; 'Down the Western Ocean'], which provides a detailed itinerary of the seventh voyage. Other texts include Lu Rong's  [; 'Bean Garden Miscellany'] (1475), Yan Congjian's  [; 'Record of Despatches Concerning the Different Countries'] (1520), and Gu Qiyuan's  [; 'Boring Talks for My Guests'] (ca. 1628). Mao Yuanyi's Wubei Zhi [] (1628) preserves the Mao Kun map [], which is largely based on material from the treasure voyages.

Luo Maodeng's  [] (1597) is a novel about the exploits of Zheng and his fleet. In the preface, Luo states that Chinese maritime power was essential to maintain world order. In Luo's work, Zheng sailed the oceans in search of a sacred imperial seal to restore harmony in the Middle Kingdom. Finlay (1992) remarks that the story gives the suggestion that, as Zheng never actually finds this seal, the world order cannot be restored by any other means than military force. Luo's novel contains a description of different classes of ships with their sizes: the 36 nine-masted treasure ships were 44.4 by 18 , the 700 eight-masted horse ships were 37 by 15 , the 240 seven-masted grain ships or supply ships were 28 by 12 , the 300 six-masted billet ships or troop transports were 24 by 9.4 , and the 180 five-masted combat ships or warships proper were 18 by 6.8 . Dreyer (2007) argues that this work holds little to no evidential value as a historical source, but also notes that Duyvendak thinks that it may be based on some truth.

The  and the  describe the following circumstances of what happened to the official archives about the expeditions. During the reign of the Chenghua Emperor (r. 1465–1487), an order was issued to retrieve the documents concerning the expeditions to the Western Ocean from the Ministry of War archives. However, the official Liu Daxia had hidden and burned the documents. He dismissed the accounts as "deceitful exaggerations of bizarre things far removed from the testimony of people's ears and eyes."

The  adds the following to the story. The Minister of War Xiang Zhong (in office 1474–1477) sent a clerk to retrieve the documents, but the clerk could not find them after several days of searching. Liu eventually confessed and justified his actions to Xiang by stating that "the expeditions of Sanbao to the Western Ocean wasted tens of myriads of money and grain, and moreover the people who met their deaths [on these expeditions] may be counted by the myriads. Although he returned with wonderful things, what benefit was it to the state? This was merely an action of bad government of which ministers should severely disapprove. Even if the old archives were still preserved they should be destroyed in order to suppress [a repetition of these things] at the root." Xiang Zhong was recorded to have been impressed by this explanation.

Dreyer (2007) notes that Liu could not have had access to the records and doubts his alleged involvement. Duyvendak (1939) states that the Ministry of War officials were not influential enough to stop the retrieval of the documents and speculates that Liu may have destroyed them with the Minister of War's approval.

Suryadinata (2005) remarks that Southeast Asian sources also provide information about the Ming treasure voyages, but that their reliability should be scrutinized as these local histories can be intertwined with legends but still remain relevant in the collective memories of the people concerned. For instance, he highlights the difficulties of doing research about the role of the Chinese voyages in the Islamization of Java and Malacca, as these activities are not mentioned in the Chinese chronicles and local accounts may contain more legend than history.

Arabic sources provide insight on the dates of the fleet's arrival and course of events at various locations in the Arabic region, which supplements the general time frames provided in Chinese sources. It also offers insight about the commodity exchange, such as which commodities were traded and what value was placed on Chinese trade goods or gifts. The Tarih al-Yaman fi d-daulati r-Rasuliya (ca. 1440) is an example of an Arabic text that adds to the insight about the dates and commodity exchange. The Qurrat al-Uyun fi Akhbar al-Yaman al-Maimun (1461–1537) describes an encounter between Rasulid Sultan al-Nasir Ahmad (r. 1400–1424) and Chinese envoys, providing an example of a ruler who willingly accedes to the requested protocol of the tributary relationship in the unique perspective of a non-Chinese party. The Kitab as-Suluk li-ma rifat duwal al-muluk (1436–1442), a text from Mamluk Egypt, describes the contacts between the Chinese and the Mamluk rulers, which adds to the dating and understanding of the expedition to Mecca during the seventh voyage.

Legacy

In 1499, shortly before Vasco da Gama's return from India to Portugal, Girolamo Sernigi reported on the Portuguese accounts from da Gama's expedition that "certain vessels of white Christians" had made port at Calicut on the Malabar coast generations before their arrival. He speculated that these unknown mariners could have been the Germans or the Russians, but concluded that they may learn who those people are when da Gama arrives. After his arrival at Calicut, da Gama began hearing tales of pale bearded men who sailed with their giant ships along the local coastal waters of Calicut generations before. The Portuguese had encountered Malabar traditions that preserved the memory of Zheng He's voyages, but they were not aware that these tales were about his fleets. They would eventually discover that these unknown mariners were the Chinese. Da Gama's men were apparently even mistaken for the Chinese at first on arrival at the East African coast, because the Chinese were the last pale-skinned strangers arriving in large wooden ships in the memories of the East African people.

In the late 16th century, Juan González de Mendoza wrote that "it is plainly seene that [the Chinese] did come with the shipping unto the Indies, having conquered al that is from China, unto the farthest part thereof. [...] So that at this day there is great memory of them [...] The like notice and memory is there in the kingdom of Calicut, wheras be many trees and fruits, that the naturals of that countrie do say, were brought thither by the Chinos, when that they were lords and governours of that countrie."

During a Harvard University speech in November 1997, President Jiang Zemin praised Zheng for spreading Chinese culture abroad. Many present-day Chinese people perceive that these expeditions were conducted in accordance with Confucian ideals. Since 2005, in commemoration of the Ming treasure voyages, China has annually celebrated its National Maritime Day on 11 July. That year also marked the 600th anniversary of Zheng's maiden voyage.

Although the present-day popular narrative may emphasize the peaceful nature of the voyages, especially in terms of the absence of territorial conquest and colonial subjugation, it overlooks the heavy militarization of the Ming treasure fleet to exercise power projection and thereby promote its interests. In present-day Chinese political discourse, with rising developments in China's maritime capabilities and ambitions, the Ming treasure voyages are evoked to underscore a peaceful emergence of modern China. It is suggested that, by drawing parallels between contemporary China and the historical narrative as provided by these voyages, this political process provides several functions for China: it stimulates national pride, shapes national identity, reaffirms a maritime identity, legitimizes the development of maritime power, provides an image of a harmonious and peaceful development, highlights interconnectedness with the broader world, and provides contrast to the violent nature of western colonialism. As such, the Ming treasure voyages play an important narrative role in China's desire to change its strategic paradigm to that of a maritime power.

Notes

References

Bibliography

External links 

 Bragg, Melvyn; Mitter, Rana; Lovell, Julia; Clunas, Craig; Morris, Thomas (2011). "The Ming Voyages". In Our Time. BBC Radio 4.
 Luard, Tim (2005). "Swimming Dragons". Masterpiece. BBC World Service. 
 Mitter, Rana; Crighton, Ben; Smith Rosser, Elizabeth (2018). "Zheng He: The Admiral Goes to Africa". Chinese Characters. BBC Radio 4.
 Smith, Adam (2013). "The Voyages of Chinese Explorer Zheng He". Great Voyages: Travels, Triumphs, and Tragedies. Penn Museum.
 Waley-Cohen, Joanna (2012). "To Sail the Seas: Marine Technology and the Treasure Fleets of Early Ming China". Technology and Society in Pre-Modern China. Brown University.

Indian Ocean
Maritime history of China
Ming dynasty
Naval warfare
 
Yongle Emperor